Solid Ball of Rock is the tenth studio album by heavy metal band Saxon released in 1991 on Virgin Records. Five of its 11 tracks were written by new bassist Nibbs Carter, who co-wrote another three songs.

"For our audience – and without an audience there is no band – our focus returned on Solid Ball of Rock…" noted singer Biff Byford. "Since then we've been right on it." Phil Sutcliffe in Q Magazine referred to the album as "a modicum of celebratory rock 'n' roll chest beating".

Track listing

Personnel
Saxon
Biff Byford – vocals, engineer
Graham Oliver – guitar
Paul Quinn – guitar
Nibbs Carter – bass guitar
Nigel Glockler – drums

Production
Kalle Trapp – producer, engineer

Charts

References

Saxon (band) albums
1991 albums
Virgin Records albums